The following is the official canvassing of votes by the Congress of the Philippines for the 1998 Philippine presidential and vice presidential election.

Presidential election

Vice presidential election

References 

1998 in the Philippines